Leslie Newburn Rainey (10 January 1881 – 27 August 1962) was an Australian sportsman who played Australian rules football, cricket and tennis. He was a first-class cricketer for Victoria, footballer for Essendon and Melbourne in the Victorian Football League (VFL), as well as a tennis player at the Australasian Championships (now known as the Australian Open).

After managing only five appearances for Essendon during his time at the club in 1899 and 1900, Rainey crossed to Melbourne where he had more success. He played a full season in 1902, including Melbourne's semi final loss to his old club, and kicked 17 goals. Rainey finished his football career with 23 VFL games and 20 goals.

Rainey played his cricket as an all-rounder and participated in two first-class matches for Victoria, both against Tasmania at the Melbourne Cricket Ground. He put in a good performance in the second of those matches, in 1905, scoring an unbeaten 60 and taking 6/46 in Tasmania's second innings.

He competed in the 1914 and 1924 Australasian Tennis Championships.

See also
 List of Victoria first-class cricketers

References

External links

Cricinfo: Leslie Rainey

1881 births
1962 deaths
People from South Yarra, Victoria
Cricketers from Melbourne
Tennis players from Melbourne
Essendon Football Club players
Melbourne Football Club players
Australian cricketers
Victoria cricketers
Australian male tennis players
Australian rules footballers from Melbourne
People educated at Melbourne Grammar School